Richard Konkolski (born July 6, 1943) is Czech-American around-the-world sailor. He was born in Oderberg, Nazi Germany (now Bohumín, Czech Republic), and has been a naturalized US citizen since 1994.

References

1943 births
Czech emigrants to the United States
People from Bohumín
Living people
Czechoslovak male sailors (sport)
American male sailors (sport)
Ocean rowers
Single-handed sailors
People with acquired American citizenship
Recipients of Medal of Merit (Czech Republic)